Long Julan is a Kenyah longhouse in the interior of the Miri division of Sarawak, Malaysia.

The people belong to the Lepoh Abong ethnic group within the Kenyah tribe.

Long Julan is located in the upper reaches of the Baram River at its confluence with Sungai Julan, a tributary which flows down from the Usun Apau National Park.

If the Baram Dam hydroelectric project goes ahead, Long Julan will be one of the villages affected by the flooding of 389,000 hectares of jungle.

Neighbouring settlements include:

References

Villages in Sarawak
Miri Division